Magdaléna Rybáriková was the defending champion, but she withdrew from the competition.

Lucie Šafářová defeated Klára Zakopalová in the final 6–3, 7–5.

Seeds

Main draw

Finals

Top half

Bottom half

External links 
 Main draw*

Sparta Prague Open - Singles
WTA Prague Open